Paruna may refer to:
Paruna, South Australia
Paruna Sanctuary, a nature reserve in south-west Western Australia.